Teatertosset is a 1944 Danish family film directed by Alice O'Fredericks. A separate Swedish version Dolly Takes a Chance was also made.

Cast
 Marguerite Viby as Dorrit Madsen
 Hans Kurt as Knud Andersen
 Karl Gustav Ahlefeldt as Ole Vang
 Johannes Meyer as Hr. Fuglsang
 Else Jarlbak as Nanna Sten
 Sigrid Horne-Rasmussen as Gerda
 Preben Neergaard as Harald
 Erik Sjøgreen as Jens
 Helga Frier as Fru Vildemose
 Henry Nielsen as Regissør Lund
 Knud Heglund as Instruktør Iversen
 Else Colber as Vera
 Ib Schønberg as Teaterdirektør Brummer

References

External links

1944 films
1944 musical films
1940s Danish-language films
Danish black-and-white films
Films directed by Alice O'Fredericks
Films scored by Sven Gyldmark
Danish musical films